Akylbay (Aqılbay) is a rural locality (a village) in Voyadinsky Selsoviet, Yanaulsky District, Bashkortostan, Russia. The population was 78 as of 2010. There are 5 streets.

Geography 
Akylbay is located 30 km northwest of Yanaul (the district's administrative centre) by road. Iskhak is the nearest rural locality.

References 

Rural localities in Yanaulsky District